George Alvin Massenburg (September 19, 1894 – November 25, 1968) was an American politician. A Democrat, he served in the Virginia House of Delegates from 1926 to 1950 and served as its Speaker from 1947 to 1950.

Personal life
Massenburg was born in Hampton, Virginia to Virginius and Virginia Massenburg. He left high school after two years for an electrical engineering apprenticeship. He became a maritime pilot in the area of Hampton Roads and the mouth of the Chesapeake Bay, eventually becoming president of the Virginia Pilot Association. He held a commission in the United States Coast Guard Reserve, rising to the rank of captain during the World War II era.

He married Carrie Wood of Hampton October 19, 1918.

Political career
Massenburg first entered the House of Delegates in 1926. He became Democratic floor leader from 1936, succeeding Ashton Dovell when he became speaker, and served until becoming speaker himself. By 1940 he had become chair of the Privileges and Elections committee. He succeeded Thomas B. Stanley as Speaker in 1947, after Stanley's election to the United States House of Representatives. He retired from the House in 1950.

From 1948–52 Massenburg was chair of the State Democratic Committee. He was a delegate to the 1948 and 1952 Democratic National Conventions. In 1956, he was an unsuccessful candidate for presidential elector in support of Adlai Stevenson and Estes Kefauver.

Death
Massenburg died in Hampton November 25, 1968. He was interred in the cemetery of St. John's Episcopal Church in Hampton.

Notes

References

External links

1894 births
1968 deaths
Democratic Party of Virginia chairs
People from Elizabeth City County, Virginia
Politicians from Hampton, Virginia
Speakers of the Virginia House of Delegates
Democratic Party members of the Virginia House of Delegates
United States Coast Guard captains
20th-century American politicians